Keiichirō, Keiichiro or Keiichirou (written: , , , , ,  or ) is a masculine Japanese given name. Notable people with the name include:

, Japanese actor
, Japanese politician
, Japanese golfer
, Japanese photographer
, Japanese writer
, Japanese economist, professor
, Japanese musician
, Japanese painter
, Japanese badminton player
, Japanese speed skater
, Japanese footballer
, Japanese video game designer
, Japanese mixed martial artist
, Japanese photographer

Fictional characters
, a character in the manga series Gender-Swap at the Delinquent Academy

Japanese masculine given names